The Center for Popular Democracy (CPD) is an American advocacy group that promotes progressive politics. CPD is a federation of groups that includes some of the old chapters of ACORN. The group's stated goal is to "envision and win an innovative pro-worker, pro-immigrant, racial and economic justice agenda." The organization is allied with teachers’ unions and has published studies criticizing charter schools.

Campaigns and actions
The organization gained national prominence during the protests over Brett Kavanaugh's nomination to the United States Supreme Court. One of the organization's co-executive directors, Ana Maria Archila, confronted U.S. Senator Jeff Flake over his support for the judge and other activists had questions for U.S. Senator Rand Paul.

Private prisons
CPD has run a years-long campaign against private prisons, and prison companies have warned investors that activist groups are a threat to their future profitability. This notice to investors came after lenders like JP Morgan Chase bowed to pressure from CPD and other groups and agreed to stop doing business with prison companies.

Local Progress
Local Progress is a project of CPD, and works to organize grassroots groups on the outside and progressive politicians on the inside to advance an inside/outside strategy for change. It was founded in 2012 to connect progressive leaders in different cities so they can learn from each other's experiences, share policy ideas and model legislation. It also regularly brings local officials together so they can learn from each other in person and share ideas. Local Progress board members include Brad Lander, Helen Gym, Gregorio Casar, Phillipe Cunningham, Tefere Gebre, Lorena González, and other local officials and national progressive leaders.

Funding
CPD has received funding from the Bauman Foundation, the Ford Foundation, the Democracy Alliance, and the Open Society Foundations.

References

Organizations established in 2012
Non-profit organizations based in New York City
Progressive organizations in the United States
2012 establishments in the United States